The Empire of Japan competed at the 1924 Summer Olympics in Paris, France.

Background
Japan secured its first Olympic medals in the 1920 Summer Olympics in Antwerp, Belgium; however, suffered from severe embarrassment when it found its Olympic team stranded in Belgium without the funds necessary to return home. The weaknesses of the Japan Amateur Athletic Association, which sponsored the team, exposed, the Japanese government agreed to subsidize future Olympic participation. Other preparation on a national level included the designation of November 3 as “National Fitness Day” with games held at the athletic grounds of Meiji Shrine in Tokyo.

For the 1924 Olympics, Japan fielded a team of 28 athletes, who competed in four events. The team was equipped by Mizuno Corp., which later became one of the world's leading sportswear and equipment manufacturers.

Medalists

| width=78% align=left valign=top |

|  style="text-align:left; width:23%; vertical-align:top;"|

Aquatics

Swimming

Ranks given are within the heat.

 Men

Athletics

Eight athletes represented Japan in 1924. It was the nation's third appearance in the sport as well as the Games.

Ranks given are within the heat.

Tennis

 Men

Wrestling

Freestyle wrestling

 Men's

Greco-Roman

 Men's

References
Guttmann, Allen. Japanese Sports: A History. University of Hawaii Press (2001),

External links
Official Olympic Reports
International Olympic Committee results database

Notes

Nations at the 1924 Summer Olympics
1924
Olympics